Donald Norford (date of birth unknown) is a former Bermudian cricketer. Norford's batting style is unknown, though it is known he played as a wicket-keeper.

Norford made his debut for Bermuda in a List A match against Trinidad and Tobago in the 1997/98 Red Stripe Bowl, with him making three further List A appearances in that tournament, two against Jamaica and one against the Windward Islands. He scored a total of 22 runs in his four List A matches, at an average of 7.33 and a high score of 21.

References

External links
Donald Norford at ESPNcricinfo
Donald Norford at CricketArchive

Living people
Bermudian cricketers
Year of birth missing (living people)
Wicket-keepers